Lungavilla is a comune (municipality) in the Province of Pavia in the Italian region Lombardy, located about 50 km south of Milan and about 15 km southwest of Pavia.

Lungavilla borders the following municipalities: Castelletto di Branduzzo, Montebello della Battaglia, Pizzale, Verretto, Voghera.

People
 Luigi Furini, (1954), poet

References

External links
 Official website 

Cities and towns in Lombardy